I Want to Live may refer to:

Film and TV
 I Want to Live!, 1958 film starring Susan Hayward
 I Want to Live! (1983 film), television remake of the 1958 film starring Lindsay Wagner
 I Want to Live (1953 film), Mexican crime film
 I Want to Live (1976 film), Austrian film
 I Want to Live (1982 film), Croatian film
 I Want to Live (2018 film), Lithuanian film

Music
 I Want to Live (album), an album by John Denver  1978

Songs
 "I Want to Live", a song written by Johnny Mandel, from the soundtrack of the 1958 film
 "I Want to Live", a hit single by Greek band Aphrodite's Child 1969
 "I Want to Live" (John Denver song), 1978
 "I Want to Live" (Josh Gracin song), a 2004 song by Josh Gracin
 "I Want to Live", a song by Gavin Friday from Adam 'n' Eve, later covered by Grace and Naomi Campbell
I Want to Live (Skillet song)

Other
 I Want to Live, a novel by Lurlene McDaniel
 I Want to Live (hotline), a Ukrainian hotline created for Russian soldiers wishing to surrender during the 2022 Russian invasion of Ukraine